Digitivalva arnicella is a moth of the family Acrolepiidae. It is found in Norway, Sweden, the Netherlands, Belgium, Denmark, Germany, France, Switzerland, Austria, Italy, Hungary, Slovakia, the Czech Republic, Romania, Poland and Lithuania.

Adults are on wing in May.

The larvae feed on Arnica montana. They mine the leaves of their host plant. The mine starts as a light green, narrow, sometimes branching corridor. It widens considerably later. The frass is deposited in an irregular, broad central line. Larvae often leave their mine and start anew in another leave. Pupation takes place in a separate, lower-surface mine. The larvae are white. They can be found from autumn to May.

References

Acrolepiidae
Moths of Europe
Moths described in 1863
Taxa named by Carl von Heyden